Adhan Mohamed (born 3 November 1966) is an Egyptian weightlifter. He competed in the men's super heavyweight event at the 1988 Summer Olympics.

References

1966 births
Living people
Egyptian male weightlifters
Olympic weightlifters of Egypt
Weightlifters at the 1988 Summer Olympics
Place of birth missing (living people)